Saroba is a genus of moths of the family Noctuidae.

Description
Palpi sickle shaped, where the second joint reaching above vertex of head and tapering to extremity. Third joint long. Antennae ciliated in male. Thorax and abdomen smoothly scaled. Tibia moderately hairy. Forewings with nearly rectangular apex. Hindwings with usually truncate anal angle. Vein 5 from below middle of discocellular.

Species
 Saroba ceylonica Walker, 1865
 Saroba maculicosta Walker, 1858
 Saroba niphomacula Lower, 1903
 Saroba pustulifera Walker, 1865
 Saroba rufescens Pagenstecher, 1884
 Saroba trimaculata Warren, 1903

References

 
 

Calpinae
Moth genera